The Hogg Family and Houston: Philanthropy and the Civic Ideal is a 2009 non-fiction book by Kate Sayen Kirkland, published by the University of Texas Press. It discusses the Hogg family and its philanthropic efforts towards the city of Houston as well as its place in the Progressivism movement.

Background
Kirkland originates from Houston and is a historian.

Reception
Mary Kelley Scheer of Lamar University wrote that the book is "Well written and extensively researched" and that "Kirkland has provided an engaging and insightful look into the often private world of philanthropy." Scheer criticized how the volume is sometimes too "laudatory" of the Hogg family, noting that privately financed philanthropy is "by its very nature" "elitist".

Kathleen D. McCarthy of the Graduate Center of the City University of New York wrote that the book "breaks new ground" by focusing on the relatively under-studied Hogg family and that "valuable, interesting, and readable tale of a single family's contributions to a major southern city." McCarthy stated that it would have been good if the author included comparisons to other female philanthropists.

See also
 Hogg Building
 Ima Hogg
 James S. Hogg
 Varner–Hogg Plantation State Historic Site

References

Further reading
 Kirkland, Kate. Boles, John B. (advisor) 2004. "Envisioning a progressive city: Hogg family philanthropy and the urban ideal in Houston, Texas, 1910–1975." Dissertation. Abstract available.

External links
 
 The Hogg Family and Houston - Read online at Project MUSE

University of Texas Press books
2009 non-fiction books
Books about Houston
Books about families